Golden Park is a 5,000-seat baseball stadium in Columbus, Georgia, United States, that opened in 1951.  Located on the Chattahoochee River in Downtown Columbus, it is currently home to the Columbus Chatt-a-Hoots as of 2021 .  The exterior of the Golden Park is a red brick façade and has many well-landscaped sidewalks that connect to the Chattahoochee RiverWalk.

Golden Park is named after Theodore Earnest Golden SR, co-founder of Goldens' Foundry and Machine Co.  Golden led the effort in Columbus for the city's first South Atlantic League team. Golden Park was renovated in 1994 in anticipation of the softball events of the 1996 Summer Olympics that were held in the city of Columbus. In 2013, Golden Park was the home of the Beep Baseball World Series Championship game.  The Taiwan Homerun Team beat the Austin Blackhawks by a score of 5-2. It also was the home field of the Columbus Catfish from 2003-2008.

In June 2021, the park opened back up with the home team being the Columbus Chatt-a-Hoots of the Sunbelt Baseball League.

References

External links
Golden Park
Golden Park views - Ballparks of the Minor Leagues
Baseball in Columbus, Georgia, by Cecil Darby

1926 establishments in Georgia (U.S. state)
Venues of the 1996 Summer Olympics
Baseball venues in Georgia (U.S. state)
Minor league baseball venues
Olympic softball venues
Softball venues in the United States
Sports venues completed in 1926
Sports venues in Columbus, Georgia